Brent J. Crane (born July 2, 1974) is an American politician serving as a member of the Idaho House of Representatives for the 13A district. He has also served as assistant majority leader since 2010.

Education
Crane graduated from high school at Nampa Christian School and earned his bachelor's degree in political science from Boise State University.

Elections
Crane has expressed interest in running for Idaho's 1st congressional district seat in the future.

2016 
Crane was unopposed in the Republican primary and the general election.

Crane supported Ted Cruz in the 2016 Republican Party presidential primaries and introduced him at a Boise State University rally in March 2016.

2014 
Crane won the Republican primary with 2,592 votes (74.3%) against Patrick N O'Brien.

Crane was unopposed in the general election.

2012 
Crane was unopposed in the Republican primary.
Crane defeated Clayton Trehal in the general election with 10,706 votes (67.4%).

2010 

Crane was unopposed for Republican primary and the general election.

2008 

Crane was unopposed for the Republican primary and the general election.

2006 

Republican Representative Dolores Crow retired and left the seat open.

Crane won the Republican primary with 3,296 votes (57.5%) against Jim Barnes.

Crane won the general election with 10,631 votes (68.72%) against Democratic Party nominee Douglas Yarbrough and Libertarian nominee Dennis Weiler.

References

External links
Brent J. Crane at the Idaho Legislature

1974 births
Living people
Boise State University alumni
Republican Party members of the Idaho House of Representatives
People from Nampa, Idaho
21st-century American politicians